Jan Möhr Secondary School is a school situated in Windhoek, Namibia. The school was founded on March 2, 1962 and is one of the oldest schools in Namibia. The school is known for its excellent academic record. The school has continued to achieve an annual 90% and 60% pass rate for grade 10 and 12 results respectively. The school was originally known as the Windhoek West High School (WHHS) but was later changed to Jan Möhr Secondary School, being named after the then Director of Education Mr JD Mohr. The school's motto is 'Altyd My Beste', which means 'Always My Best' when translated into English.

References

Schools in Windhoek
Educational institutions established in 1962
1962 establishments in South West Africa